Topkapi is a 1964 Technicolor heist film produced by Filmways Pictures and distributed by United Artists.

The film was produced and directed by the émigré American film director Jules Dassin. The film is based on Eric Ambler's novel The Light of Day (1962), adapted as a screenplay by Monja Danischewsky.

The film stars Melina Mercouri, Peter Ustinov, Maximilian Schell, Robert Morley and Akim Tamiroff. The music score was by Manos Hadjidakis, the cinematography by Henri Alekan and the costume design by Theoni V. Aldredge.  The film won an Academy Award in 1965, with Peter Ustinov taking home the trophy for Best Supporting Actor, his second such award in 4 years.

Plot

Elizabeth Lipp (Melina Mercouri) visits Istanbul, where she sees a traveling fair featuring replicas of treasures from the Topkapı Palace.  Next she cases the Topkapı, fascinated by the emerald-encrusted dagger of Sultan Mahmud I. Leaving Turkey, she recruits her ex-lover, Swiss master-criminal Walter Harper (Maximilian Schell), to plan a  theft of the dagger. They engage Cedric Page (Robert Morley), master of all things mechanical; Giulio, "The Human Fly" (Gilles Ségal), a mute acrobat; and the burly Hans (Jess Hahn), who will provide the muscle needed for the job.

Harper and Lipp then hire small-time hustler Arthur Simon Simpson (Peter Ustinov) to drive a car into Turkey to transport hidden explosives and firearms for use in the burglary. Simpson, knowing nothing of Harper's and Lipp's plans, is arrested at the border when Turkish Customs find the firearms.  Because Simpson has no information for Turkish police, they conclude that the weapons are to be used in an assassination. Turkish Major Tufan decides to use Simpson to spy on Harper and Lipp for the police. Page, picking up the car in Istanbul, is told by a police ruse that only the "importer" Simpson is permitted to drive it in Turkey. While traveling with the gang, Simpson leaves cryptic notes for his police handlers, but most of his intelligence is worthless since Simpson is still ignorant of the plan.

Hans' hands are injured in a scuffle with the drunken cook, Gerven (Akim Tamiroff), and Simpson is engaged as a substitute, prompting him to confess that the police are watching them. Knowing they face arrest if they try to escape Turkey, or use their equipment, Harper improvises a new plan in which they will give the still-oblivious police the slip, and steal the dagger without using their weapons.  Then they'll "surrender" to the police, and claim to have found explosives in their car.  Just before they leave, Simpson discards his last note, then leaves with the others.

Harper arranges to give the police the slip. That evening, Harper, Simpson, and Giulio, after attending a competition of Turkish wrestling, steal the dagger and leave a replica in its place. Unnoticed by the thieves, during the robbery a bird flies through the window they entered by and is trapped inside the room when the window is closed.

The gang deliver the dagger to Joseph (Joe Dassin), proprietor of the traveling fair display, who will smuggle it out of the country. The gang members then go to police headquarters to "reveal" their discovery of weapons in the car. The inspector asks Simpson to vouch for Harper and Lipp's whereabouts that day. Simpson, seeming to waver, throws in his lot with the others, and backs up their alibi.  Before the police release Simpson and the others, the trapped bird in the Topkapı triggers the alarm, alerting police officers across Istanbul.  When word of the Topkapı alarm reaches the police, Major Tufan confronts the thieves, displaying Simpson's last note, which has just enough information to link all of them to the theft.  Tufan tells them all that he now knows why they were in Turkey.  "A little bird told me," he says.

Ultimately, the gang is seen in a Turkish prison, where Lipp begins to tell them of her fascination with the Russian Imperial Crown Jewels in the Kremlin. The end title sequence shows them apparently having escaped from jail some time later and walking in snow by a Russian city.

Cast

Production
Ambler's novel is different from the movie on several counts, with the story narrated by Simpson (named Arthur Abdel Simpson in the book), so that the reader only gradually comes to work out what Harper and his associates are really up to.  Simpson in the book is blackmailed into driving the car to Istanbul after Harper catches him trying to steal Harper's travelers' checks.  The book features frequent flashbacks to Simpson's schooldays in England, which help to explain his character and motives more clearly than in the film.

According to Jules Dassin, he originally planned to cast Peter Sellers as Simpson, but Sellers refused to work with Maximilian Schell, who he claimed had a reputation for being difficult.  Dassin was not prepared to dispense with Schell, and so cast Ustinov in place of Sellers.

Peter Ustinov won the Academy Award for Best Supporting Actor for his portrayal of Simpson.

Appearing in supporting roles were Gilles Ségal as the “human fly" and Joe Dassin as Joseph, who runs the traveling fair display that is supposed to smuggle the dagger out of Turkey. The athletic Ségal later inspired other 'trickwire' stunts, including a few used for the Mission: Impossible TV show and movie. Joe Dassin was the son of the film's director Jules Dassin: he appeared as an actor in a handful of films, but was better known as a singer-songwriter.

The film was shot on location in Istanbul, Turkey, in Kavala, Greece, and in Paris at the Boulogne-Billancourt Studios.

Reception
The film earned $7 million at the box office, earning $4 million in US theatrical rentals.

See also
 List of American films of 1964

References

External links

 
 
 
 

1964 films
1960s crime comedy films
1960s heist films
American crime comedy films
American heist films
Films based on British novels
Films featuring a Best Supporting Actor Academy Award-winning performance
Films directed by Jules Dassin
Films set in museums
Films set in Istanbul
Films set in Turkey
Films set in Greece
Films shot in Kavala
United Artists films
Films scored by Manos Hatzidakis
Filmways films
1964 comedy films
1960s English-language films
1960s American films